The Damnation Game is a horror novel by English writer Clive Barker, published in 1985. It was written just after finishing the first trilogy of Books of Blood, and tells a Faustian story that touches on topics such as incest, cannibalism, and self-mutilation in a frank and detailed manner. It was his first novel.

Synopsis
Marty Strauss is a gambling addict recently released from prison.  He is hired as the personal bodyguard of Joseph Whitehead, one of the wealthiest men in the world.  The job is more complicated and dangerous than first he thought.  He gets caught up in a series of supernatural events involving Whitehead, and a devilish man, Mamoulian, through whom Whitehead made a deal with the Devil during World War II.  Whitehead is haunted with Mamoulian's supernatural powers (like raising the dead) to urge him to satisfy Mamoulian's pact.  Whitehead decides to escape after several encounters with Mamoulian and after having his wife, his former bodyguard, and his daughter, Carys, taken away from him.  With hope left to save Carys, Marty Strauss believes that Whitehead deserved his punishment after all and also decides to save the heroin addict from being another victim of the damnation game.

Characters
Marty Strauss:
A man addicted to gambling and released from prison who works and lives on Joseph Whitehead's Estate as a personal bodyguard.

Joseph Whitehead: An important, rich, famous, and eccentric man who is known as 'the thief' in the prologue: he is involved with the Faustian bargain with Mamoulian.

Carys The daughter of Mr. Whitehead.  She was intrigued by Martin Strauss, her runner, the second she saw him.  She has a special gift, and battles addiction.

Mamoulian: The main antagonist of the story, Mamoulian has the ability to give and take life.  With a sense of death about him that give him a creepy disposition he has the demeanor of a devilish, almighty being.

Anthony Breer: A serial child-killer who was resurrected after hanging himself by Mamoulian, in order to be his enforcer.

Bill Toy: Joseph Whitehead's main assistant/right-hand man.

Pearl: Joseph Whitehead's personal cook.

Luther: Joseph Whitehead's personal limousine driver.

Reception
Algis Budrys praised The Damnation Game as "a masterly novel," saying that "it doesn't fail to deliver what a good horror story should," that "it delivers it elegantly," and that "come(s) to grip with the classic themes."

Neil Gaiman reviewed The Damnation Game for Imagine magazine, and stated that "Quite simply the most literate and disturbing horror novel I have ever read. This is the place that nightmares are spawned - read it at your peril, but read it you must."

Dave Langford reviewed The Damnation Game for White Dwarf #85, and stated that "Barker wrenches it with flamboyance and effective video-nasty imagery – but so violently that he strips the thread long before the book's over."

References

1985 British novels
1985 fantasy novels
Novels by Clive Barker
Works based on the Faust legend
Debut fantasy novels
Weidenfeld & Nicolson books
Self-harm in fiction
Novels about cannibalism
Incest in fiction
Weird fiction novels
1985 debut novels